Heavy horse may refer to:
Draft horse, the largest-sized horse breeds
Heavy cavalry, a level of armament of mounted troops
Heavy Horses, an album by Jethro Tull
 The Heavy Horses, a Canadian country/roots band